Tomás Montaño y Aarón (born 1683 in Mexico City) was a Mexican clergyman and bishop for the Roman Catholic Archdiocese of Antequera, Oaxaca. He was ordained in 1737. He was appointed bishop in 1738. He died in 1742.

References 

1683 births
1742 deaths
Mexican Roman Catholic bishops
People from Mexico City